The Lamborghini LM004 was a prototype off-road vehicle designed and built by Lamborghini.

The LM004 was essentially a modified LM002, but in order to try to make it appeal to a new range of customers it was outfitted with bucket seats, a phone, a refrigerator, and several other luxury features. The main change in the new vehicle was to outfit it with an all new, noticeably larger, 7 L V12 engine. The engine did not perform as well as expected, and the increase in weight and size was determined to not be worth the additional development. Only a single prototype was produced.

LM004